The Thar-Allah Headquarters (also spelled as Tharallah or Tharollah Headquarters) is an Islamic Revolutionary Guard Corps command. It is in charge of security for Tehran area and doubles as Headquarters with territorial responsibilities.

The Thar-Allah Headquarters is directly subordinated to the Commander of the Islamic Revolutionary Guard Corps but its day-to-day operations are supervised by an executive commander.

Due to Headquarters' role in defending the national leadership of Iran and in securing the national capital, commanders of the Thar-Allah Headquarters have been criticised for "illegally interfering" in the political process over the years.

Name 
The name of the Headquarters means “Allah will revenge Hussein’s blood” which refers to Imam Husayn ibn Ali, who was killed in the Battle of Karbala in 680 AD/61 AH.

History 
In the first decade of existence of the Islamic Republic of Iran, there were no riot-control organizations and forces. In early 1990s, serious but economically driven-protests were dealt with combat-level responses, with operating troops coming from other parts of Iran.

In response to the lack of riot forces, Ashura and al-Zahra battalions, consisting of Basij veterans, were established in 1990s, alongside specific NAJA units. The Thar-Allah Headquarters was established in 1995 by the order of Iran's Supreme National Security Council and is headed up by the chief commander of the IRGC.

The Thar-Allah Headquarters was heavily involved in the suppression of the July 1999 Iran student protests by order of the Supreme National Security Council. In the aftermath of the protests, Thar-Allah gained full independence as a command centre and was responsible for cracking down on street revolts in 2003.

The Thar-Allah Headquarters also played a major role in the suppression of the 2009 Iranian presidential election protests. While not mobilizing combat units from the IRGC Ground Forces, organizations and forces coordinated by the Thar-Allah Headquarters detained, interrogated and allegedly tortured many protestors in Thar-Allah's own facilities and detainment centers as well as in Evin Prison in Tehran.

Mission 
The Thar-Allah Headquarters is tasked with the safety and security of the capital city of Tehran, as well as Tehran and Alborz provinces. In particular, it is tasked with protecting key institutions and the offices of the Government of Iran. The Thar-Allah Headquarters is also tasked with thwarting all threats against Tehran. This mandate is reflected in two directions: security operations and social and cultural operations.

Security-oriented operations 
Security-oriented operations are the core of the tasks entrustedo to the Thar-Allah Headquarters. These missions include dealing with serious unrest as well as providing security for special events, such as presidential inaugurations and other occasions. The Thar-Allah Headquarters executes its security-related operations with specific units, such as Imam Ali riot battalions, the Imam Hussein infantry battalions, as well as with units tasked with more local operations, such as the Beit al-Muqaddas battalions, the Ashura battalions, the Al-Zahra battalions, and the Saheb-al-Zaman Special Unit. Imam Hussein battalions and their Imam Ali counterparts are operationally employed by relevant territorial commands but centrally trained and equipped by their respective Headquarters.

The Thar-Allah Headquarters receives intelligence from the Ministry of Intelligence, the Iranian Security Police, and the Intelligence Organization of the Islamic Revolutionary Guard Corps itself. Another part of Thar-Allah's mission is to track down regime opponents in cyberspace and arrest them.

Society-oriented operations 
The Thar-Allah Headquarters is also responsible for operations and tasks related to the civil society. Some of these tasks consist in monitoring and, if necessary, intervening in sociocultural and social-media activities in Tehran, in what is characterized generally as cultural engineering. In recent years, Thar-Allah cyber units have arrested several dissidents, journalists, and fashion and music influencers.

Society-oriented tasks also include the carrying out of relief and public aid operations. With the outbreak of COVID-19 pandemic in Iran, the Thar-Allah Headquarters have officially and publicly been tasked with supporting the medical efforts in Tehran.

Procedures 
Ordinarily, the primary organizations responsible for security in and around Tehran are NAJA and the Ministry of Intelligence.

In cases when the security situation spirals out of control, the Supreme National Security Council seeks Supreme Leader Ayatollah Ali Khamenei's permission to enlist the Thar-Allah Headquarters. The Ministry of Intelligence, the NAJA, and all government ministries are under operational control of this Headquarters. Sarallah Headquarters, in times of crisis, therefore acts effectively as military governor of Tehran.

Organization 

The Thar-Allah Headquarters acts as military governor authority of Tehran and has a significant combat power and influence. The Sarallah Headquarters has two sub-headquarters, Nasser-e Sarallah and Qods-e Sarallah, which serve the northwest and south/southeast of Tehran. Under the Tehran-based Sarallah headquarters, the Provincial commands established security units comprising IRGC and Basij personnel.

Besides the Commander, whose post is held by the Commander-in-Chief of the IRGC, and the Deputy Commander, who executes the daily operations, the leadership of the Thar-Allah Headquarters consist of the Supreme Leader's Representative and of the Deputy Coordinator of the Headquarters.

The Thar-Allah Headquarters has a Deputy Operations Commander, usually a Second Brigadier General. Until March 2020, the position was held by Nasser Shabani. The Headquarters also has a Medical Unit. As of 2011, it was headed by Ali Khalili, targeted by EU sanctions.

The Thar-Allah Headquarters directly controls three Provincial commands:
 Alborz province: Sepah-e Imam Hassan Mojtaba
 Tehran province: Sepah-e Sayyed al-Shohada
 Tehran city: Sepah-e Muhammad Rasoul Allah

According to the People's Mujahedin of Iran-dominated National Council of Resistance of Iran, the Thar-Allah Headquarters directly controls four subordinate bases in charge for different regions of Tehran. These bases are: 
 Qods: Northwest Tehran
 Nasr: Northeast Tehran
 Qadr: Southeast Tehran
 Fath: Southwest Tehran.

Operational units 
The Thar-Allah Headquarters is responsible for coordinating the activities of both operational and territorial units. In this respect, the Thar-Allah Headquarters may be compared to a corps-level command.

The Headquarters most important operational units are the 10th Operational Division Seyyed ol Shohada of Karaj, Alborz province, and the 27th Operational Division Mohammad Rasoul Allah in Tehran. Alongside Operational Divisions there are three Brigades: 
 Al Mohammad Security Brigade (Tehran city, Tehran province);
 1st Hazrat-e Zahra Brigade (Tehran city, Tehran province);
 20th Ramezan Independent Armored Brigade (Hassanabad, Tehran province).

Commanders 
Officially, the commander of the Islamic Revolutionary Guards Corps also retains the direct command of the Thar-Allah Headquarters. The Headquarters, however, has a deputy commander in charge of day-to-day operations. Since the establishment of the Headquarters, the executive command has been held by six individuals:

See also 
 Islamic Revolutionary Guard Corps
 Islamic Revolutionary Guard Corps Ground Forces

References 

Military units and formations of Army of the Guardians of the Islamic Revolution
Military units and formations established in 1995